To dicker is to bargain.

Dicker may also refer to:

Surname
 Dicker (surname), an English surname

Places
Upper Dicker, a village located in the parish of Arlington, East Sussex, United Kingdom
Lower Dicker, a village within the civil parish of Hellingly, East Sussex, United Kingdom
Lower Dicker, a geological site of special scientific interest, located approximately four kilometres north-west of Hailsham, East Sussex, United Kingdom
Dickering Wapentake, an administrative division of the historic county called East Riding of Yorkshire in England

Other uses
Dicker Max, a German self-propelled anti-tank gun
 Dicker-rod, a measuring device in gridiron football

See also
 
 
 Decker (surname), a German surname
 Dickerson (surname)
 Dickert, a German surname
 Dikkers, an English surname